The 2007 Gator Bowl was a post-season college football bowl game between the Georgia Tech Yellow Jackets and the West Virginia Mountaineers played on January 1, 2007, at Jacksonville Municipal Stadium in Jacksonville, Florida, United States. For sponsorship reasons, the bowl was officially known as the Toyota Gator Bowl. Down by 18 in the third quarter, West Virginia scored 21 unanswered points to win, 38–35.

The game matched Georgia Tech from the Atlantic Coast Conference against West Virginia from the Big East Conference. West Virginia entered the game ranked #13 in the AP Poll; it was West Virginia's third appearance in the Gator Bowl in the last four years and sixth overall. Georgia Tech accepted a bid to the Gator Bowl after losing the ACC championship to Wake Forest. It was Georgia Tech's first appearance in the Gator Bowl since 2000 and seventh overall.

References

External links
Official Website of the Gator Bowl

Gator Bowl
Gator Bowl
Georgia Tech Yellow Jackets football bowl games
West Virginia Mountaineers football bowl games
21st century in Jacksonville, Florida
January 2007 sports events in the United States
2007 in sports in Florida